Reginald Aspinwall (born Preston, England, 3 January 1855, died Lancaster, England, 26 February 1921) was an English landscape painter.

Life
Aspinwall was born in Preston, Lancashire where his father was the editor of the Preston Guardian. He first studied art at Preston Art School.

In the early 1870s Aspinwall moved to Lancaster as a student teacher at the Lancaster School of Art (later the Storey Institute) under the Art Master, Herbert Gilbert. In 1876 Aspinwall gained top results and received a special prize for excellence of general study.  In the Art Master's Report for the year Gilbert wrote:

Aspinwall was a prolific artist who worked in both watercolours and oils. He seems to have adhered to the landscape genre. The School of Art continued to honour him with mentions of his success in their Annual Report of 1879 as a former student.  

Aspinwall became an Associate of the Royal Cambrian Academy in 1887, and exhibited there – and at the Royal Academy in London – intermittently from 1884 to 1908.

The quality of his work varies greatly, possibly linked to the artist's growing alcohol dependence. As noted by his obituary:

For some years prior to his death, Aspinwall experienced great financial hardship and was forced into Lancaster Workhouse. In July 1920 he was moved to the Lancaster County Asylum as it was then (later the Moor Hospital buildings). Aspinwall died there on 26 February 1921 and was buried in Lancaster Cemetery.

Aspinwall has over 70 of his paintings in British public collections including several at the Harris Museum & Art Gallery in Lancashire, and 40 paintings at Lancaster City Museum.

References 

1858 births
1921 deaths
19th-century English painters
English male painters
Artists from Preston, Lancashire
20th-century English painters
20th-century English male artists
19th-century English male artists